The Slovakia national under-15 football team, controlled by the Slovak Football Association, is Slovakia's national under 15 football team and is considered to be a feeder team for the Slovakia U16 team.

Current squad 

|-----
! colspan="9" bgcolor="#B0D3FB" align="left" |
|----- bgcolor="#DFEDFD"

|-----
! colspan="9" bgcolor="#B0D3FB" align="left" |
|----- bgcolor="#DFEDFD"

|-----
! colspan="9" bgcolor="#B0D3FB" align="left" |
|----- bgcolor="#DFEDFD"

See also
Slovakia national football team
Slovakia national under-21 football team
Slovakia national under-20 football team
Slovakia national under-19 football team
Slovakia national under-18 football team
Slovakia national under-17 football team
Slovakia national under-16 football team

External links
 Slovak Football Association 
  

European national under-15 association football teams
under-15